Stevenage Borough Council is the local authority for the Stevenage non-metropolitan district of England, the United Kingdom.  Stevenage is located in the north-east of Hertfordshire, in the East of England region.

The Council consists of 39 elected members, representing thirteen electoral wards; each of the wards elects three councillors. Youth representatives from Stevenage Youth Council and the elected Stevenage Youth Mayor also attend Stevenage Borough Council meetings in a non-voting role.

The Council is currently controlled by the Labour Party, who hold 24 of the 39 seats.  Labour have controlled the council continuously since its creation as a non-metropolitan district in 1974. The Conservative Group hold 9 seats and the Liberal Democrat Group hold 6 seats and there is 1 Independent (ex-Labour). The Leader of the Labour Group and the Council is Councillor Richard Henry.

Composition

Wards
Stevenage consists of thirteen wards.

Arms

See also
Stevenage Borough Council elections

References

External links
 Stevenage Borough Council official website

Borough Council
Non-metropolitan district councils of England
Local authorities in Hertfordshire
Billing authorities in England